William Clark Hodgman  (14 May 1909 – 3 May 1997) was a Tasmanian politician. He served as a Member of the House of Assembly for Denison from 1955 to 1964 and a Member of the Legislative Council from 1971 to 1983. He was President of the Tasmanian Legislative Council from 1981 to 1983. Originally a Liberal, he became an independent in 1959.

William Clark Hodgman was the father of politicians Michael Hodgman and Peter Hodgman, and the grandfather of the 45th Premier of Tasmania and Australian High Commissioner to Singapore, Will Hodgman.

See also
 Hodgman family

References

Australian people of English descent
1909 births
1997 deaths
Officers of the Order of the British Empire
Liberal Party of Australia members of the Parliament of Tasmania
Independent members of the Parliament of Tasmania
Australian King's Counsel
20th-century King's Counsel
Presidents of the Tasmanian Legislative Council
20th-century Australian lawyers
20th-century Australian politicians